Abbasabad-e Jadid (also Romanized as ‘Abbāsābād-e Jadīd; also known as Abbāsābād) is a village in Shabeh Rural District, Jangal District, Roshtkhar County, Razavi Khorasan Province, Iran. At the 2006 census, its population was 223, in 62 families.

See also 

 List of cities, towns and villages in Razavi Khorasan Province

References 

Populated places in Roshtkhar County